Lloyd Price (March 9, 1933May 3, 2021) was an American singer-songwriter, record executive and bandleader, known as "Mr. Personality", after his 1959 million-selling hit, "Personality". His first recording, "Lawdy Miss Clawdy", was a hit for Specialty Records in 1952. He continued to release records, but none were as popular until several years later, when he refined the New Orleans beat and achieved a series of national hits. He was inducted into the Rock and Roll Hall of Fame in 1998.

Early life, family and education
Price was born on March 9, 1933, in Kenner, Louisiana, a suburb of New Orleans, and raised in Kenner. His mother, Beatrice Price, owned the Fish 'n' Fry Restaurant. Price picked up lifelong interests in business and food from her. He and his younger brother Leo were both musical.

He had formal training on trumpet and piano, sang in his church's gospel choir, and was a member of a combo in high school.

Career
Art Rupe, the owner of Specialty Records, based in Los Angeles, came to New Orleans in 1952 to record the distinctive style of rhythm and blues developing there, which had been highly successful for his competitor Imperial Records. Rupe heard Price's song "Lawdy Miss Clawdy" and wanted to record it. Because Price did not have a band, Rupe hired Dave Bartholomew to create the arrangements and Bartholomew's band (plus Fats Domino on piano) to back Price in the recording session. The song was a massive hit. His next release, "Oooh, Oooh, Oooh", cut at the same session, was a much smaller hit. Price continued making recordings for Specialty, but none of them reached the charts at that time.

In 1954, he was drafted into the US Army and sent to Korea. When he returned he found he had been replaced by Little Richard. In addition, his former chauffeur, Larry Williams, was also recording for the label, having released "Short Fat Fannie".

He eventually formed KRC Records with Harold Logan and Bill Boskent. Their first single, "Just Because", was picked up for distribution by ABC Records. From 1957 to 1959, Price recorded a series of national hits for ABC that successfully adapted the New Orleans sound, including "Stagger Lee" (which topped the Pop and R&B charts and sold over a million copies), "Personality" (which reached number 2), and "I'm Gonna Get Married" (number 3). When Price appeared on the television program American Bandstand to sing "Stagger Lee", the producer and host of the program, Dick Clark, insisted that he alter the lyrics to tone down its violent content. "Stagger Lee" was Price's version of an old blues standard, recorded many times previously by other artists. Greil Marcus, in a critical analysis of the song's history, wrote that Price's version was an enthusiastic rock rendition, "all momentum, driven by a wailing sax." In all of these early recordings by Price ("Personality", "Stagger Lee", "I'm Gonna Get Married", and others) Merritt Mel Dalton was the lead sax player; he was also in the traveling band and appeared on The Ed Sullivan Show with Price.
The personnel on the original hit recording of "Stagger Lee" included Clarence Johnson on piano, John Patton on bass, Charles McClendon and Eddie Saunders on tenor sax, Ted Curson on trumpet and Sticks Simpkins on drums.

In 1962, Price along with business partner, Harold Logan formed Double L Records. Wilson Pickett got his start on this label. Price and business partner Logan also formed a club together called Birdland in New York on 1674 Broadway in New York City.  In 1969, Logan was murdered in the office connected to the club. Price then founded a new label, Turntable.

During the 1970s, Price helped the boxing promoter Don King promote fights, including the "Rumble in the Jungle" boxing match between Muhammad Ali and George Foreman in Kinshasa, Zaire and its accompanying concert which featured James Brown and B. B. King.  He and Don King formed a record label, LPG, which issued Price's last hit, "What Did You Do With My Love", to limited success.

Price toured Europe in 1993 with Jerry Lee Lewis, Little Richard, and Gary U.S. Bonds. He performed with soul legends Jerry Butler, Gene Chandler, and Ben E. King on the "Four Kings of Rhythm and Blues" tour in 2005; concerts were recorded for a DVD and a PBS television special.

Price appears in performance footage in the 2005 documentary film Make It Funky!, which presents a history of New Orleans music and its influence on rhythm and blues, rock and roll, funk and jazz. In the film, he performs "Lawdy Miss Clawdy" with Allen Toussaint and band.

On June 20, 2010, he appeared and sang in the season 1 finale of the HBO series Treme.  he continued to sing.

Other pursuits
Price was a prolific entrepreneur. In addition to his music production and publication ownership, he started and owned businesses in various industries. He owned two construction companies, erecting middle-income housing in the 1980s in the Bronx and also homes in Staten Island.

He managed Global Icon Brands (a.k.a. Lloyd Price Icon Food Brands), which makes a line of Southern-style foods, including Lawdy Miss Clawdy food products, ranging from canned greens to sweet potato cookies, and a line of Lloyd Price foods, such as Lloyd Price's Soulful 'n' Smooth Grits and Lloyd Price's Energy-2-Eat Bar, plus Lawdy Miss Clawdy clothing and collectibles.

In 2011, Price released his autobiography, The True King of the Fifties: The Lloyd Price Story, and worked on a Broadway musical, Lawdy Miss Clawdy, focused on his life and rise to stardom with a team that included the producer Phil Ramone. The musical also told how rock and roll evolved from the New Orleans music scene of the early 1950s.

Honors and awards

 The city of Kenner, Louisiana celebrates an annual Lloyd Price Day.

Personal life and death
Price and his wife resided in Westchester County, New York. He died from diabetes complications on May 3, 2021, at a long-term care facility in New Rochelle, New York, aged 88.

Discography

Albums

Studio albums

Compilation albums

Singles

References

External links

 
 Lloyd Price Icon Food Brands
 Lloyd Price at History-of-Rock.com 
 Lloyd Price Interview (2016), NAMM Oral History Library
 
 

 
1933 births
2021 deaths
20th-century African-American male singers
21st-century African-American people
ABC Records artists
African Americans in the Korean War
African-American United States Army personnel
American rhythm and blues singers
American military personnel of the Korean War
Deaths from diabetes
Military personnel from Louisiana
People from Kenner, Louisiana
Rhythm and blues musicians from New Orleans
Rock and roll musicians
Specialty Records artists
Singers from Louisiana
Swing musicians